The 1957 North Dorset by-election was a parliamentary by-election for the British House of Commons constituency of North Dorset on 27 June 1957.

Vacancy
The by-election was caused by the death of the sitting Conservative MP, Robert Crouch on 7 May 1957. He had been MP here since gaining the seat in 1950.

Election history
North Dorset had been won by the Conservatives at every election since 1950 when they gained the seat from the Liberals. The result at the last General election was as follows;

Candidates
The Conservatives selected Lt-Col. Richard Glyn. He had first been chosen by the local Conservatives to defend the seat at the 1945 general election, but was defeated by the Liberal candidate Frank Byers. 
The Liberals selected 34-year-old John Alun Emlyn-Jones as candidate. He had fought the seat of Barry just outside Cardiff in the 1950 general election. He was the son of John Emlyn Emlyn-Jones who had been the Liberal MP here from 1922-24. 
Labour re-selected H J Dutfield, who had stood here at the last General Election. An Independent candidate, H C Wright, intervened.

Result

Aftermath
The result at the following General election;

References
 Who's Who: www.ukwhoswho.com
 By-Elections in British Politics by Cook and Ramsden

See also
 List of United Kingdom by-elections
 United Kingdom by-election records
 

North Dorset by-election
By-elections to the Parliament of the United Kingdom in Dorset constituencies
North Dorset by-election
North Dorset by-election
20th century in Dorset